Mystic Mile is an electric blues album by Robben Ford and the Blue Line that was released in 1993. In this second album for Stretch, Ford shows growth as songwriter besides his virtuosity as a guitarist. The album featured the collaboration of Chick Corea as executive producer.

Track listing
All tracks composed by Robben Ford except where indicated
"He Don't Play Nothin' But the Blues"
"Busted Up"
"Politician" (Jack Bruce, Pete Brown)
"Worried Life Blues" (Big Maceo Merriweather)
"Misdirected Life Blues"
"Moth to a Flame"
"Trying to Do the Right Thing (For Anne)"          
"Say What's on Your Mind" (Roscoe Beck)  
"The Plunge"   
"I Don't Play" (Willie Dixon)   
"Mystic Mile"

Personnel
 Robben Ford – acoustic and electric guitar, vocals, backing vocals
 Roscoe Beck – arranger, bass guitar, double bass, vocals
 Tom Brechtlein – drums, backing vocals

Additional musicians
 Dan Fornero – flugelhorn, trumpet
 Bob Malach – saxophone
 David Grissom – rhythm guitar, lead guitar

References

1993 albums
Robben Ford albums
Albums recorded at Sound City Studios